David John Shipperley (12 April 1952 – 21 January 2017) was an English professional footballer. His clubs included Charlton Athletic, Plymouth Argyle, and Gillingham, where he made over 140 Football League appearances. At Gillingham he was named Player of the Year in consecutive seasons, for 1975–76 and 1976–77.

After his professional career he joined the Metropolitan Police and later worked as a postman in Hayes, West London, where he also managed non-league team Brook House. He died in January 2017. His son Neil also became a professional footballer.

References

1952 births
2017 deaths
English footballers
Gillingham F.C. players
Plymouth Argyle F.C. players
Charlton Athletic F.C. players
Footballers from Uxbridge
Reading F.C. players
Association football central defenders